W5 is a Canadian news magazine television program produced by CTV News. The program is broadcast Saturday nights at 7 p.m. on the CTV Television Network, with repeat broadcasts at later times on CTV as well as co-owned channels CTV 2, CTV News Channel, and Investigation Discovery. The program also airs in a radio simulcast on CFRB (1010) in Toronto.

The title refers to the Five Ws of journalism: Who, What, Where, When and Why? It is the longest-running news magazine/documentary program in North America and the most-watched program of its type in Canada.

History

W5 is the longest-running current affairs/newsmagazine program in North America and the third longest-running Canadian television program.

It was launched as W5 on September 11, 1966, just after the demise of CBC Television's This Hour Has Seven Days, at a time when the CTV network was on the brink of bankruptcy. The program's magazine format is considered an inspiration for a number of similar programs, including the American program 60 Minutes which premiered two years later.

The program's first executive producer and host was Peter Reilly. He quit only a few weeks into the first season of W5, in a dispute with John Bassett, who owned the CTV network's biggest station, CFTO-TV in Toronto. Reilly went on to become the first host of the CBC's later current affairs offering, The Fifth Estate. Peter Rehak was executive producer through the 1980s and 1990s.

Robert Hurst oversaw a revamping of the program look in the fall of 1995. Fiona Conway became executive producer but left for ABC News in 1998. Conway was succeeded by senior producer Ian McLeod and after he left  Malcolm Fox became the executive producer from September 2000 until September 2009. Anton Koschany served as executive producer from 2009-2021, during which time the program moved into HD and produced an expanded number of episodes per season. He was succeeded by current Executive Producer Derek Miller.

The program's first regular host was Ken Cavanagh, with reports from CTV National News journalists such as Doug Johnson and Frank Drea, who later became a Progressive Conservative member of Provincial Parliament in Ontario and Trina McQueen, later president of CTV. During the 1970s, Henry Champ was a long-time host, along with Ken Lefolii and Tom Gould. Helen Hutchinson, who also hosted during the 1970s (concurrent with her tenure as co-host of the morning show Canada AM), was one of the first women to gain a prominent position in television news in Canada. Jim Reed joined the programme in 1972 as a field producer and was later appointed as host along with Hutchinson and Champ.

Eric Malling joined W5 in 1990 from CBC's rival news magazine, The Fifth Estate. In 1991, a new team of reporters also joined the program: Susan Ormiston, Christine Nielsen, and Elliott Shiff.  The program was called W5 with Eric Malling until Malling moved to hosting the television program Mavericks in 1995.

In 1993–94, an in-depth report on New Zealand showed the results of a nation that had suffered the effects of a debt wall. The report had a significant influence and was used by governments to justify cutting social services. The government of Alberta included transcripts of the program when it sent back rejected grant applications and Ontario Premier Bob Rae cited the program during cabinet debates on the deficit. Author Linda McQuaig criticized the program saying: "It was just full of misinformation," saying that Malling distorted the situation in New Zealand by presenting what was really a short-term currency crisis as something else: national bankruptcy and the loss of credit. The real issue - an overvalued currency - she says, was never brought up. "I'm talking about confusing the issues," she says, "making people believe things that aren't true because that's the point that he wanted to make. You don't need to come out with a technical lie to do that."

In 1996 for its 30th anniversary, the program was rebranded to W-FIVE and became more populist. Hosts included top CTV journalists, including Lloyd Robertson, Craig Oliver and Jim O'Connell.

With broadcast shifting to HD for the 2009–2010 season the program reverted to its traditional title W5 with a revised graphic treatment and a new theme that reflects its investigative nature and culminates in five notes representative of the five Ws of journalism.

Recent hosts have included Robertson, Sandie Rinaldo, Kevin Newman and Lisa LaFlamme (with Robertson continuing to co-host following his 2011 retirement as anchor of the CTV National News until 2016 when he was named special correspondent). W5 has produced such stories as a possible cure for multiple sclerosis ("The Liberation Treatment"), an investigation into fatal shootings by RCMP officers (nominated for a Michener Award), an investigation of abuses at the Nova Scotia Home for Colored Children ("The Throwaway Children"), an annual expose of used car dealer trickery, rampant corruption in Canada's immigration system, and personal stories of burn recovery from the Bali bombing.

Since 2000, the program has officially been designated a "documentary series", with only one or two segments filling an hour-long episode, due to Canadian Radio-television and Telecommunications Commission regulations that count documentaries, but not older-style newsmagazines, as "priority programming". In the 2012–2013 season, the program began experimenting with loosening the format, with occasional three story episodes.

For a period of time in the late 1970s and into the 1980s, the program's introductory theme music used part of "Fool's Overture", a song by the UK band Supertramp. The current theme was composed by Doug Pennock, who has also composed the theme for CTV National News and music for other CTV special projects, including the 2007 two-hour documentary Triumph & Treachery: The Brian Mulroney Story.

On October 24, 2009, CTV unveiled a new look for W5, introduced a new logo and began broadcasting for the very first time in high definition. The title was once again rebranded, back to its original title as W5. This look was further refined with the start of the program's 47th season on September 22, 2012. The start of the 48th season saw the introduction of David Tyler as the current in-show narrator.

Controversies 
W5 came under controversy during the 1970s when it aired a feature called "Campus Giveaways" that used incorrect statistics to conclude that foreign students were eroding white Canadians' opportunities for a secondary education and benefitting from public universities which were being funded by Canadian taxpayers, without exploring the statement's backgrounds. The host of the program stated:
 ... there are so many oriental foreign students that they rarely mix with their Canadian classmates. It's as if there are two campuses at Canadian universities—foreign and domestic. Certainly this Chinese theatre attracts a full house, but not one Canadian student attended.1

It has been alleged that the feature was specifically directed to form a negative view towards Chinese and Chinese Canadians. As well, it did not determine if the people filmed in that particular episode were actually Chinese or Chinese Canadian. After protests by Chinese Canadians, including Joseph Yu Kai Wong (later founder of the Yee Hong Centre for Geriatric Care), W5 retracted this statement and apologised. The president of CTV at the time, Murray Chercover, issued the following statement on April 16, 1980:

 ... our critics—particularly Chinese Canadians and the universities—criticized the program as racist; they were right.... We share the dismay of our critics that this occurred. We sincerely apologize for the fact that Chinese Canadians were depicted as foreigners and for whatever distress this stereotyping may have caused them in the context of our multicultural society.2

This event also led to the formation of the Chinese Canadian National Council in order to form a stronger voice representing Chinese Canadians nationwide.

Hosts and producers 
Hosts, reporters, and producers associated with the program have included:

 Peter Reilly (first host)
 Heinz Avigdor
 Ken Cavanagh
 Henry Champ
 Wei Chen
 Tom Clark
 Bill Cunningham
 Chad Derrick
 Gordon Donaldson
 Frank Drea
 Malcolm Fox (2000–2009)
 Tom Gould
 Les Harris
 Robert Hurst
 Allya Davidson
 Fiona Conway
 Ian McLeod 
 Helen Hutchinson
 Doug Johnson
 Tom Kennedy
 Peter Kent
 Anton Koschany
 Ken Lefolii
 Jack McGaw
 Derek Miller
 Michael Maclear (1977–78)
 Victor Malarek
 Eric Malling (1990–1996)
 Dennis McIntosh
 Brett Mitchell
 Kevin Newman
 Christine Nielsen
 Susan Ormiston
 Sandie Rinaldo
 Jim Reed
 Peter Rehak (1981–1996)
 Lloyd Robertson
 Morley Safer
 Merle Shain
 Elliott Shiff
 Sylvia Sweeney
 Carole Taylor
 Rosemary Vukmanich
 Patrick Watson
 Genevieve Wescott
 Jon Woodward
 Don Young
 Avery Haines

References

1979a "Campus Giveway." W5 Transcripts. September 30, 1979 (Released October 4, 1979).
"News release: Statement by President and Managing Director, CTV" April 16, 1980.

External links

Show website
Protesting racism on TV - CBC Archives

1960s Canadian television news shows
1970s Canadian television news shows
1980s Canadian television news shows
1990s Canadian television news shows
2000s Canadian television news shows
2010s Canadian television news shows
2020s Canadian television news shows
1966 Canadian television series debuts
CTV Television Network original programming
CTV News
Television series by Bell Media